Orange marches are a series of parades by members of the Orange Order and other Protestant fraternal societies, held during the summer months in various Commonwealth nations, most notably Ulster. The parades typically build up to 12 July celebrations marking Prince William of Orange's victory over King James II & VII at the Battle of the Boyne in 1690.

Orange walks are considered controversial and face opposition from Catholics, Irish nationalists and Scottish nationalists who see the parades as sectarian and triumphalist. They have also drawn criticism in recent years from other religious communities, left-wing groups, and trade unions.

The "marching season"

The "marching season" generally refers to the months April to August in Northern Ireland and includes marches by groups such as the Ancient Order of Hibernians, the Apprentice Boys of Derry, and the Royal Black Institution as well as the Orange Order. The Orange Order is arguably the most active marching group. Typically, each Orange Lodge holds its own march at some time before 12 July, accompanied by at least one marching band. On 12 July each district holds a larger parade consisting of all the lodges in that district, and sometimes including lodges from outside Northern Ireland. This is particularly the case with the Belfast district, whose parade commonly features several Scottish lodges and often some from other countries. In most districts, the parade's location varies from year to year, rotating through suitable towns. Belfast is an exception; it has kept more or less the same route for many decades. The only major parade after the Twelfth is on the last Sunday in October, when lodges celebrate Reformation Day by parading to church.

Some walks commemorate historic events. Most notably, 12 July marches observe the Battle of the Boyne. Marches in Northern Ireland on and around 1 July originally commemorated the participation of the 36th (Ulster) Division in the Battle of the Somme. Since the beginning of the Troubles, most of these parades have evolved into the "mini Twelfth", and have little obvious connection with World War I.

There are still a few explicitly commemorative parades. Reformation Day parades honour Martin Luther, who nailed his 95 theses to the church door in Wittenberg, starting the Reformation that brought about the Protestant churches.

Form of parades

All Orange walks include at least one lodge, with officers. The lodge is almost always accompanied by a marching band, often a flute band, but also fife and drum, silver, brass and accordion bands. Participants range from as few as one lodge, up to dozens of lodges for major events such as the Twelfth. Elderly or infirm lodge members often travel the parade route in vehicles such as black taxis.

In recent decades, it has become much more common for members of ladies' lodges to walk, although men still greatly outnumber them in most parades. Larger walks, especially on the Twelfth, may be headed by a figure on a white horse dressed as William of Orange. A few parades include others in historical fancy dress; or, more rarely, a float, such as that constructed for the 1990 Twelfth celebrations to represent the Mountjoy, the ship which lifted the Siege of Derry.

Regalia and accessories
Parading Orangemen usually wear dark suits. Some Orangemen wear bowler hats and walk with umbrellas, although it is not mandatory. Walkers wear V-shaped orange collarettes (often inaccurately referred to as sashes) bearing the number of their lodge, and often badges showing degrees awarded within the institution, and positions held in the lodge. Some lodge officers also wear elaborate cuffs, and many walkers wear white gloves, although has become less common. Most lodges carry at least one flag, most commonly the Union Flag. Other common flags include the Ulster Banner, the Flag of Scotland and the Orange Order flag. Lodges also usually carry a banner with the lodge's name and number, and usually depicting William of Orange on at least one side. Other popular banner subjects include deceased lodge members, local landmarks, and the Bible with a Crown.

Bands
Typically, there is one band per lodge. Some bands have formal connections with the lodge, but in most cases it is simply hired for the day. Bands and lodges pair up by word of mouth, through the band or lodge advertising in Protestant publications such as the Orange Standard, or as a result of a lodge member hearing the recordings  many bands produce. Most bands have a strongly Protestant ethos and display bannerettes and flags associated with loyalism, and in some cases, paramilitary groups. Many are associated with or named after Protestant areas such as the Shankill Road in Belfast, although the number of "Shankill Road" bands suggest that many of their members must also be from elsewhere. In 1985, concerned that some bands' behaviour was bringing the Order into disrepute, the Grand Orange Lodge instituted a system of contracts requiring bands to behave appropriately. According to writer and former Orangeman Brian Kennaway, the contracts have been largely ineffective, mostly because of the Order's reluctance to enforce them.

Controversy

Throughout the history of the Orange Order, Orange walks have faced opposition, both from Catholics and nationalists, who have seen them as sectarian and triumphalist; and from the general public, due to inconvenience and controversies associated with them. Although many nationalists find the parades offensive, conflict usually arises only when a walk passes through or near a Catholic-dominated area. During The Troubles, many marchers were verbally abused, had objects thrown at them, and were involved in abusing onlookers, something walkers following the march still do today. The marching season requires a significant police presence to avert violence. In the early 1970s, parading was banned on several occasions, although never on 12 July.

Currently, of the more than 2000 annual parades in Northern Ireland, only a handful are considered majorly contentious. The best known is the Drumcree conflict. The Drumcree area, near Portadown has a history of parading disputes going back to the 19th century. The current dispute centres on the refusal of the Parades Commission to allow the Portadown lodge through the Catholic Garvaghy Road during their annual celebrations in early July. The conflict led to severe rioting in the late 1990s, but the area has been relatively calm in recent years.

Parade opponents in Drumcree and elsewhere have put forward several arguments against the parades:

 That they are sectarian regardless of their route
 That they celebrate the defeat of Irish Catholicism
 That when they go through majority- or traditionally-Catholic areas, they are particularly insulting and triumphalist
 That they cause serious inconvenience to residents, as roads must be closed and, in particularly contentious areas, access to the roads denied

One observer has argued that the Orange Institution and its demonstrations deny Nationalists and Catholics their human rights.

The Orange Order and its supporters have countered that:

 The parades are not sectarian, and that any sectarian activity or violence is perpetuated by outsiders and "hangers-on" over whom the Order has no control
 That inconvenience is caused mostly by the need for police to protect marchers from the violence of their opponents
 That the disputes are not actually about parading, but are a way for republicans to attack Protestantism.

They have also argued that they have a fundamental "right to march"—that any group should be able to walk down "the Queen's highway" without interference. In practice, however, the Order has tended to oppose marches by republicans and other "disloyal" groups on the grounds that there is no right to parade sedition.

The Order has a policy of non-negotiation with residents' groups, as it believes they are dominated by Sinn Féin and do not represent residents' actual opinions.

In a 2011 survey of Orangemen throughout Northern Ireland, 58% said they should be allowed to march through nationalist areas with no restrictions, and 20% said they should negotiate with residents first.

Walks outside of Northern Ireland

Orange walks were once common throughout Ireland, especially on 12 July. Since partition, those in the Republic of Ireland have dwindled in number, due to local antagonism and the decline of the Protestant population of the Republic. The last walk in Dublin was in 1937. 

The only remaining walks in the Republic all now take place in County Donegal, an Ulster county which borders Northern Ireland. Within County Donegal, several small Orange walks take place each year in East Donegal, while the main walk within the county takes place each year at Rossnowlagh in South Donegal. A major Apprentice Boys 'demonstration' takes place each August in Raphoe, also in East Donegal. A march organised by Love Ulster, a unionist group inspired by the Orange Order, was scheduled to be held in Dublin in 2006; however, the march was canceled when rioting broke out before it began.

Orange walks continue across Scotland, but they are concentrated in Glasgow, Lanarkshire, Ayrshire, Renfrewshire and West Lothian.

In 2003, a survey of 1,029 Scottish people revealed that 53% were either in favour or strongly in favour of banning Orange Walks, and 24% opposed banning them. Of these respondents, Catholics were more likely than Protestants to say that Orange Walks should be banned (66% and 39%, respectively).

It is accepted that events such as national days are marked by parades by other organisations, religious and otherwise, such as the Scouts and the Boys' Brigade—but apart from one-off anniversaries such as centenaries, that tends to be the limit of such activity.  This is in stark contrast to Orange Walks which—in some areas of Glasgow—can be seen and heard almost every day during parts of the summer months. Consequently, and also due to disproportionate costs, initiatives have been introduced to the Glasgow City Council to restrict the number of marches.

This disconnect between the frequency of Orange walks and wider societal norms has caused the walks to be more broadly criticised as incitements to hatred and violence. The Grand Orange Lodge of Scotland has supported police moves to fine spectators for sectarian activity. Grand Master Ian Wilson has said: "All the effort that has gone into defending our interests can be destroyed by the stupidity of the few".

Marches were common in Australia at the turn of the 20th century. The Kalgoorlie and Boulder marches in the 1890s and 1900s attracted conflict between Catholics and Protestant marchers. An increase in membership in recent years has seen a revival of the Orange Order in Australia, and an annual Twelfth of July parade is currently held in Adelaide. In New Zealand, walks continued until at least the 1920s, but no longer take place.

In Canada, Orange Walks on 12 July were once large public occasions, particularly in the provinces of Ontario and Newfoundland that have a strong Loyalist heritage dating from the time of the American Revolution. Toronto's Orange Parade has been held annually since 1821, but its turnout has dwindled in recent decades. Some parades continue to be held in other parts of Canada. Orange walks have occurred in Liverpool.

Notes

Orange Order
Parades
Christian processions
Protestantism in the United Kingdom